Spicy Chile (Spanish:Chile picante) is a 1983 Mexican comedy film directed by René Cardona Jr. and starring Andrés García, Angélica Chain and Alberto Rojas.

Cast
 Andrés García ... (segment " La infidelidad") 
 Angélica Chain ... (segment " La infidelidad")  
 Alberto Rojas ... (segment " La infidelidad") 
 Blanca Guerra ... (segment " Los Compadres")  
 Héctor Suárez ... (segment " Los Compadres") 
 Princesa Lea ... (segment " Los Compadres") 
 Alfredo Wally Barrón ... (segment " La infidelidad")  
 María Cardinal ... (segment " Los Compadres")  
 Karen Castello ...  (segment " La infidelidad")  
 Eduardo de la Peña  ...  (segment " Los Compadres")  
 Alma Estela ...  (segment " La infidelidad")  
 Irene Gallegos ...  (segment " La infidelidad")  
 Juan Jaramillo ... (segment " La infidelidad")  
 Tito Junco ...  (segment " Los Compadres")  
 Norma Lee  ...  (segment " La infidelidad")  
 Jeannette Mass ... (segment " Los Compadres") 
 Lyn May ...  (segment " Los Compadres")  
 Carlos Monden ...  (segment " La infidelidad")  
 Lourdes Morales ...  (segment " La infidelidad")  
 Polo Ortín ...  (segment "Infidelidad, La")  
 Juan Carlos Peralta ...  (segment " La infidelidad")  
 Sofia Vargas ...  (segment " La infidelidad")  
 Pedro Weber 'Chatanuga' ... (segment " Los Compadres")  
 Sybille Young  ...  (segment " La infidelidad")  
 Gerardo Zepeda ... (segment " La infidelidad")

References

Bibliography 
 Charles Ramírez Berg. Cinema of Solitude: A Critical Study of Mexican Film, 1967-1983. University of Texas Press, 2010.

External links 
 

1983 films
1983 comedy films
Mexican comedy films
1980s Spanish-language films
Films directed by René Cardona Jr.
1980s Mexican films